Christopher James Russell (born 16 February 1989) is an English cricketer.  Russell is a right-handed batsman who bowls right-arm medium-fast.  He was born in Newport on the Isle of Wight.

Having played for the Worcestershire Second XI since 2008, Russell made his full debut for Worcestershire in a List A match against the Unicorns in the 2010 Clydesdale Bank 40, claiming his maiden List A wicket when he dismissed Chris Murtagh.  He made a further appearance in that competition against Surrey.  Russell didn't feature for Worcestershire in the 2011 season. A notable appearance in the 2012 season saw Russell gain match figures of 6–72 in a drawn two-day tour match against South Africa - only days after England had only managed to take two wickets in a five-day test match.

References

External links

1989 births
Living people
People from Newport, Isle of Wight
English cricketers
Worcestershire cricketers
Shropshire cricketers